Security Station is a 1981 fantasy role-playing game adventure for The Fantasy Trip, published by Metagaming Concepts.

Plot summary
Security Station is an adventure in which the player characters must explore the corridors and rooms of an ancient yet high-tech fallout shelter, which had been transported to Cidri eons ago by Mnoren magic.

Reception
William A. Barton reviewed Security Station in The Space Gamer No. 38. Barton commented that "Security Station should prove an interesting and possibly profitable/fatal adventure for your TFT characters."

Reviews
Pegasus #10 (Oct. 1982)

References

Role-playing game supplements introduced in 1981
The Fantasy Trip adventures